(449 — 9 September 498) was the 24th legendary Emperor of Japan, according to the traditional order of succession. No firm dates can be assigned to this Emperor's life or reign, but he is conventionally considered to have reigned from 4 February 488 to 9 September 498.

Legendary narrative
Ninken is considered to have ruled the country during the late-5th century, but there is a paucity of information about him. There is insufficient material available for further verification and study.

Along with his younger brother, Prince Woke, Oke was raised to greater prominence when Emperor Seinei died without an heir. The two young princes were said to be grandsons of Emperor Richū. Each of these brothers would ascend the throne as adopted heirs of Seinei, although it is unclear whether they had been "found" in Seinei's lifetime or only after that.

Oke's younger brother, who would become posthumously known as Emperor Kenzō, ascended before his elder brother. This unconventional sequence was in accordance with an agreement made by the two brothers.

Ninken's reign
When Emperor Kenzo died without heirs, Prince Oke succeeded him as Emperor Ninken.

Ninken's contemporary title would not have been tennō, as most historians believe this title was not introduced until the reigns of Emperor Tenmu and Empress Jitō. Rather, it was presumably , meaning "the great king who rules all under heaven".

Ninken married to Emperor Yūryaku's daughter Kasuga no Ōiratsume no Himemiko, a second cousin of him. Their daughter Tashiraka was later married to Emperor Keitai, successor or possibly usurper after her brother, and became mother of Emperor Kinmei, a future monarch and lineal ancestor of all future monarchs of Japan. There apparently was also another daughter, Princess Tachibana, who in turn is recorded to have become a wife of Senka and mother of Princess Iwahime, who herself became a consort of Kimmei and bore Emperor Bidatsu, a future monarch and lineal ancestor of current monarchs of Japan.

Ninken was succeeded by his son, who would accede as Emperor Buretsu.

The actual site of Ninken's grave is not known. The Emperor is traditionally venerated at a memorial Shinto shrine (misasagi) at Osaka.

The Imperial Household Agency designates this location as Ninken's mausoleum. It is formally named Hanyū no Sakamoto no misasagi.

Consorts and children
Empress (Kōgō) : , Emperor Yūryaku's daughter

, married to Emperor Keitai 

, married to Emperor Senka
, later Emperor Buretsu

Consort (Hi) : , Wani Nitsume's daughter
, married to Emperor Ankan

Ancestry

See also
 Emperor of Japan
 List of Emperors of Japan
 Imperial cult

Notes

References
 Aston, William George. (1896).  Nihongi: Chronicles of Japan from the Earliest Times to A.D. 697. London: Kegan Paul, Trench, Trubner.  
 Brown, Delmer M. and Ichirō Ishida, eds. (1979).  Gukanshō: The Future and the Past. Berkeley: University of California Press. ;  
 Ponsonby-Fane, Richard Arthur Brabazon. (1959).  The Imperial House of Japan. Kyoto: Ponsonby Memorial Society. 
 Titsingh, Isaac. (1834). Nihon Ōdai Ichiran; ou,  Annales des empereurs du Japon.  Paris: Royal Asiatic Society, Oriental Translation Fund of Great Britain and Ireland.  
 Varley, H. Paul. (1980). Jinnō Shōtōki: A Chronicle of Gods and Sovereigns. New York: Columbia University Press. ;  

 
 

Japanese emperors
5th-century births
People of Kofun-period Japan
5th-century monarchs in Asia
5th-century Japanese monarchs
498 deaths